The 1934 Swedish Ice Hockey Championship was the 13th season of the Swedish Ice Hockey Championship, the national championship of Sweden. AIK won the championship.

Tournament

First round
 Karlbergs BK - Södertälje IF 3:1
 Södertälje SK - IK Sture 2:1
 UoIF Matteuspojkarna - IK Hermes 2:0
 Reymersholms IK - IK Göta 5:4
 AIK - Djurgårdens IF 6:1
 Nacka SK - IFK Mariefred 1:0
 IFK Stockholm - Lilljanshofs IF 2:1

Quarterfinals 
 AIK - IFK Stockholm 3:0
 Karlbergs BK - UoIF Matteuspojkarna 2:0
 Hammarby IF - Södertälje SK 2:1
 Nacka SK - Reymersholms IK 1:0

Semifinals
 AIK - Karlbergs BK 1:0
 Hammarby IF - Nacka SK 1:0

Final 
 AIK - Hammarby IF 1:0

External links
 Season on hockeyarchives.info

Cham
Swedish Ice Hockey Championship seasons